Rosewood is an unincorporated community in Levy County, Florida, located just off State Road 24 approximately  northeast of Sumner and  northeast of Cedar Key. An African-American community prospered there in the early 20th century, until a white mob destroyed it in the 1923 Rosewood massacre.

History

Settlement
The initial settlers of Rosewood were both Black and White. When most of the cedar trees in the area had been cut by 1890, the pencil mills closed, and many White residents moved to Sumner. By 1900, the population in Rosewood had become predominantly Black. The village of Sumner was predominantly White, and relations between the two communities were relatively amicable.  The population of Rosewood peaked in 1915 at 355 people.

Two Black families in Rosewood named Goins and Carrier were the most influential. The Goins family brought the turpentine industry to the area, and in the years preceding the attacks, were the second largest landowners in Levy County. To avoid lawsuits from White competitors, the Goins brothers moved to Gainesville, and the population of Rosewood decreased slightly. The Carriers were also a large family, responsible for logging in the region. By the 1920s, almost everyone in the close-knit community was distantly related to each other. Although residents of Rosewood probably did not vote because voter registration requirements in Florida had effectively disfranchised Blacks since the turn of the century, both Sumner and Rosewood were part of a single voting precinct counted by the U.S. Census. In 1920, the combined population of both towns was 344 Blacks and 294 Whites.

Before the massacre
As was common in the late 19th century South, Florida had imposed legal racial segregation under Jim Crow laws, requiring separate Black and White public facilities and transportation. Blacks and Whites created their own community centers: in 1920, the residents of Rosewood were mostly self-sufficient. They had three churches, a school, a large Masonic Hall, a turpentine mill, a sugarcane mill, a baseball team named the Rosewood Stars, and two general stores, one of which was White-owned. The village had about a dozen two-story wooden plank homes, other small two-room houses, and several small unoccupied plank farm and storage structures. Some families owned pianos, organs, and other symbols of middle-class prosperity. Survivors of the Rosewood massacre remember it as a happy place. In 1995 survivor Robie Mortin recalled at age 79, "Rosewood was a town where everyone's house was painted. There were roses everywhere you walked. Lovely."

Etymology
The name "Rosewood" refers to the reddish color of cut cedar wood.

Economy

Before 1923

The local industry was centered on timber. The hamlet grew enough to warrant the construction of a post office and train depot on the Florida Railroad in 1870, but it was never incorporated as a town.

Decline of Rosewood's economy (1923–1950)
In 1923, during the infamous Rosewood massacre, the entire town of Rosewood was razed except for John Wright's General Store. After the majority of the population fled Rosewood, the once profitable turpentine industry began to fade as newer, alternative synthetic products were being produced. By 1950, the turpentine industry practically no longer existed.

Since 1950
Since the 1950s, several businesses were established in Rosewood, including a general store; fisheries; charter tours; clam, oysters and other types of Mollusca farmers; agricultural farms; restaurants; storage facilities and a small airfield. Several neighborhoods have been developed around these businesses.

Rosewood Massacre

In January 1923, white men from nearby towns lynched Sam Carter allegedly in response to a claim that a white woman, Fannie Taylor, in nearby Sumner had been beaten and possibly raped by a Black drifter.  When Black citizens defended themselves against further attack, several hundred Whites organized to comb the countryside hunting for Black residents and burned almost every structure in Rosewood. Survivors hid for several days in nearby swamps and were evacuated by train and car to larger towns. The local sheriff and the Governor refused to send aid, including the National Guard. Although state and local authorities were aware of the violence, they made no arrests for the activities in Rosewood. The town was abandoned by Black residents during the attacks. None ever returned.

Massacre reparations
In the spring of 1994, the Florida state legislature voted to give $2 million in compensation for the nine surviving family members (equaling $150,000 each). In December 2010, a state scholarship was established for descendants of families that survived the massacre. Governor Jeb Bush in 2004 placed a plaque memorializing the massacre in front of John Wright's general store, the only remaining structure from the Rosewood Massacre. This plaque was vandalized on at least one occasion when it was shot at from a passing car.

Legal Issues

During the debate over Florida House Bill 591, the Florida Legislature's Bill that established reparations based on the Massacre, the Special Master appointed by the Legislature compared the destruction of Rosewood to the taking of private homes during the Internment of Japanese Americans and specifically cited the case of William Minoru Hohri vs. United States.

Community services 
In 1980, the Rosewood Volunteer Fire Department was officially established and the station number was designated as 80 in District 4.

Films
 Rosewood (1997)

References

Further reading

External links
Rosewood - Ghost Town
Virtual Rosewood Research Site
Song about the massacre written by Fire Next Time

Former populated places in Levy County, Florida
Populated places established in 1845
1923 disestablishments in Florida
1845 establishments in Florida
Former populated places in Florida
Populated places established by African Americans
Populated places disestablished in 1923